is a Japanese football player. He plays for Fujieda MYFC.

Career
Shuhei Yamada joined J3 League club Fujieda MYFC in 2016.

References

External links

1993 births
Living people
Aoyama Gakuin University alumni
Association football people from Osaka Prefecture
Japanese footballers
J3 League players
Fujieda MYFC players
Association football goalkeepers